Eduard Jan "Ed" de Noorlander (born 10 March 1945) is a retired Dutch decathlete who finished in ninth place at the 1968 Summer Olympics.

References

1945 births
Living people
Athletes (track and field) at the 1968 Summer Olympics
Dutch decathletes
Olympic athletes of the Netherlands
Athletes from Rotterdam